Télétoon+ (formerly Télétoon, stylized téléTOON+) is a French pay television channel operated by Canal+, focusing its programming on animation (and live-action in evening since the Canal+ acquisition) for children ages 7 to 14. It was launched on 17 December 1996. The channel is not related to Télétoon, a Canadian channel owned by Corus Entertainment which airs French-language animated programming.

History
Télétoon was launched at TPS launch on 16 December 1996.

Teletoon +1 was launched on 2 September 2002, importing the popular concept in UK « replay channel ».

Télétoon joined Canalsat on 21 March 2007 who merged with TPS.

Between 2006 and 2009, an English-language version of Télétoon was distributed on MyTV in Nigeria.

Since 1 July 2015, Télétoon+ is available in HD.

In 2017, Télétoon+ became a Canal+ exclusive. Since this year Télétoon+ became a premium channel, previously most of its programmes were firstly broadcast on Canal+ Family. In Switzerland, it is also distributed in the "Teleclub Les +" bouquet.

Programmes on Télétoon+
Canal+ produce a lot of TV series.

Almost Naked Animals
Angel's Friends
Angelo Rules
Atomic Betty
Action Dad
Atomic Puppet
Being Ian
Boule et Bill
Braceface
Butt-Ugly Martians
Captain Biceps
Captain Flamingo
Chaotic
Copy Cut
Cosmic Quantum Ray
Cosy Corner
The Crumpets
Cyberchase
The Daltons
Danny Phantom
Detentionnaire
Trust Me, I'm a Genie
Etucekoi
Endangered Species 
Fairly OddParents
FloopaLoo, Where Are You?
Girlstuff/Boystuff
Go Away, Unicorn!
Gnark
Grossology
Horseland
Harvey Street Kids
Hot Wheels: Battle Force 5
Iggy Arbuckle
I, Elvis Riboldi
Jacob Two-Two
Johnny Test
Jewelpet
Kaeloo
Kika and Bob
King
Kuu Kuu Harajuku
Kirarin Revolution
Kirby: Right Back at Ya!
Kung Foot
Lili's Island
Little Tornados
Legend Quest
Lucky Luke
Magical Doremi
The Magic School Bus
Martin Morning
The Minimighty Kids
The Minimighty Squad
Monster Allergy
My Dad the Rock Star
My Life as a Teenage Robot
The Mysterious Cities of Gold
Ned's Newt
Nerds and Monsters
Numb Chucks
Oddbods
Olliver's Adventures
Oggy and The Cockroaches
Polly Pocket
Zig & Sharko
Peanuts
Pet Alien
Plankton Invasion
Rainbow Rangers
Robotboy
Scary Larry
Seaside Hotel
Sgt. Frog
Sherlock Yack
Shugo Chara!
Sitting Ducks
Smurfs
SpongeBob SquarePants
Stickin' Around
Stoked
Supernoobs
Swept Away
Sweet Little Monsters
Teenage Mutant Ninja Turtles
Adventures of Sonic the Hedgehog
Tokyo Mew Mew
Total Drama Island
Total DramaRama
Tracey McBean
The Sisters 
What About Mimi?
Winx Club
Yakari
Zoé Kézako
Z-Squad

References

External links
   Official Site

Television stations in France
Children's television networks
Television channels and stations established in 1996
Canal+